Tomislav Osmanli (Macedonian Cyrillic: Томислав Османли, Macedonian pronunciation: [tǒmislaʋ osˈmanɫɯ ]; born 25 October 1956) is a Macedonian author, screenwriter, playwright, and journalist.

Biography 
Osmanli was born in Bitola, People's Republic of Macedonia, at that time a constituent republic of Yugoslavia. His father Dimitrie Osmanli was an acclaimed Macedonian film, theater director and author, whilst his mother was of Greek heritage from Thesaloniki. Osmanli was raised to speak both Macedonian and Greek languages, and was taught Aromanian by his paternal uncle.

The family moved to Skopje when he was two years old. Osmanli studied law at the Saints Cyril and Methodius University, Skopje, where his father also lectured and was a profound influence in his formative years.

In 1981 Osmanli published his seminal work Филмот и политичкото (English: Film and Politics) a theoretical study of political cinema. In 1987 Osmanli released Стрип: Запис со човечки лик (English: Comics: Scripture of the Human Image), the first scholarly work dedicated to Comics studies published in Yugoslavia.

Osmanli served as an independent editor and member of the editing board of his nation's oldest daily  newspaper Nova Makedonija from 1991 to 1998, and as chief of arts and cultural programs at Telma TV between 1998 and 2016.

He is a member of the Macedonian Writer`s Association and a member of both, the Macedonian PEN and the Aromanian PEN centers.

Personal life 
Osmanli was married to Snežana Osmanli (nee Stanković), an original founder and a vice-president of the Skopje-based think-tank group Council on Foreign Relations, fellow academic, and most influential adviser to former Macedonian President Kiro Gligorov, witness and actor in the formative years and events of the contemporary Macedonian statehood. The couple had two children, a son Dimitar and a daughter Aleksandra. He was widowed following the death of his wife from cancer in 2013.

Apart from his native Macedonian, Osmanli is fluent in Greek, Serbo-Croatian, English, French, and Italian. He is also an avid bibliophile, usually reading several books simultaneously.

He is a laureate of the highest state and literary prizes in his country for his artistic work and achievements.

Publications and other works 

 Луѓе без адреси (People Without an Address), screenplay (1976)
 Филмот и политичкото (Film and Politics), Seventh Art`s aesthetic and media theory (1981)
 Ѕвездите на '42 (Stars '42), screenplay author of the television feature film (1984)
 Salon Bums, satyrical theater comedy (1986)
 Скопски сновиденија (Skopje Dreamaries), screenplay author of the television feature film (1987)
 Стрип: Запис со човечки лик (Comics: Scripture of the Human Image), Ninth Art`s aesthetic and media theory (1987)
 Скопски диптих (Skopjan Diptych), book of two author`s feature film screenplays (1991)
 Медиумот што недостасува (The Missing Medium), book of urban essays (1992)
 Победа над себе (Victory over Oneself), inter-ethnic campaign screenplay (1992)
 Ослушнувања во глуво доба (Listenings to a Deaf Age), book of political essays (1993)
 Мементо за еден град (Momento for a City), multimedia stage project (1993)
 Немирни сенки (Restless Shadows), film cabaret play (1993)
 Пеперутката на детството (The Butterfly of the Chilhood), stories (1993)
 Ангели во отпад (Angels of the Dumps), feature movie screenplay author (1994)
 Двајца во Еден (Two in Eden), theater play (1995)
 Светулки во ноќта (Fireflies in a Night), theater play (1997)
 Новиот цар (The New King), theater play (1998)
 Смок лета на небото (Snakeguy Flies in the Skies), TV feature film screenplay (1999)
 Апокалиптична комедија (Apocalyptic Comedy), thearter play (1999)
 Звездите над Скопје (Stars over Skopje), book of plays (2000)
 Техно ѕвезда (Techno Star), theater play (2000)
 Виолетни светлини и сенки (Purple Lights and Shadows), short stories collection (2001)
 Пат до Парамарибо (Road to Paramaribo), theater play (2001)
 Игри низ жанровите (Plaing Through the Genres), book of plays (2003)
 Приказни од Скопје (Tales from Skopje), book of stories (2004)
 Луѓе од меѓувреме Characters from a Meantime), screenplay (2008)
 Светилка за Ханука (Lamp for Hanukkah) (2008)
 Каприча (Capriccios), book of stories (2009)
 Дваесет и првиот (Twenty-first), novel (2009)
 Грађански простор (Civic Space), study over the salons and the space of civic  (2011)
 Зад аголот (Around the Corner), novel (2012)
 Бродот. Конзархија (Ship. Conarchy), novel (2016)
 Пруга за ледната пролет ( Tracks to an Icy Spring), Holocaust stage project (2017)
 Океан од слики (Ocean of Images), book of stories (2018)
 Нишала од злато, (Pendulums of Gold), тхеатер play (2018)
 Тајното братство на носталгичарите) (The Secret Nostalgycs` Brotherhood), short story (2019)
 Скопски драми (Skopje Dramas), play (2019)
 Нови драми (New Plays), book of plays (2019)
 ПараδΩξicoN/Парадоксикон (Paradoxicon), book of stories and novellas (2020)
 Бдеења Блажеви - Пеења до потомците, (Blaže`s Singing - Singings to the Posterity), a thousand-versed poem honoring the poet and linguist Blazhe Koneski (2021)
 Средби и разговори - со доајените на нашата уметност, (Meetings and Conversations with the Doyens of Our Art), six huge interviews (2021)
 Деветта уметност - антропоморфизмот на стрипот, (The Ninth Art - On the Anthropomorphism of the Comics), Ninth Art`s aesthetic and media theory (2021)
 Столб што пее, (Singing Pillar), novel (2022)

References 

1956 births
Living people
People from Bitola
Macedonian writers